Max Knapp (13 November 1899 - 16 December 1979) was a Swiss film and television actor.

Selected filmography
 Der Kegelkönig (1942)
 Gilberte de Courgenay (1942)
 Polizischt Wäckerli (1956)
 Sacred Waters (1960)
 William Tell (1961)
 Assassination in Davos (1975)

References

External links

1899 births
1979 deaths
Swiss male film actors